Phillip "Chief" Cooper was a college football player.

College football
Cooper was a prominent tackle for the LSU Tigers football team, and captain of the 1916 team. Walter Camp gave him honorable mention in 1916. He was also twice selected All-Southern. He was nominated, though not selected, for an Associated Press All-Time Southeast 1869-1919 era team.  Cooper was from Amite, Louisiana.

References

People from Amite City, Louisiana
Players of American football from Louisiana
LSU Tigers football players
American football tackles
American football guards
All-Southern college football players